Adolphus Humbles (1845 – 1926) was an American merchant and toll road operator in Lynchburg, Virginia. He was an early supporter of the Virginia Theological Seminary in Lynchburg, Virginia (a precursor to Virginia University of Lynchburg) and Humbles Hall is named for him. He built a commercial and events building. He was African American.

Biography 

Humbles built what is known as the Humbles Building (118-5318-0039) at 901 Fifth Street in what is now known as the Fifth Street Historic District. Like the True Reformers Hall, the Humbles Building is a large, three-story, mixed use facility that contained two storefronts on the first floor and an auditorium on the second floor. Humbles was a successful merchant in Campbell County and operated the toll road between Lynchburg and Rustburg (the seat of Campbell County). He served as the Treasurer of both the Virginia State Baptist Convention and the Virginia Theological Seminary and College (now known as Virginia University of Lynchburg), where the school’s main building bears his name. Also active in politics, he served as Chairman of the Campbell County Executive Committee for the Republican Party for thirteen years.

Humbles granddaughter was denied a part of his inheritance because "interracial marriage" was not recognized in Virginia. Her parents were married in Canada.

Humbles was on the board of the True Reformers.

See also
Pierce Street Historic District

References

1845 births
1926 deaths
People from Lynchburg, Virginia